Cyclosomus is a genus of beetles in the family Carabidae, containing the following species:

 Cyclosomus basalis Kolbe, 1897 
 Cyclosomus buquetii Dejean, 1831 
 Cyclosomus collarti Burgeon, 1931 
 Cyclosomus equestris Boheman, 1848 
 Cyclosomus flexuosus (Fabricius, 1775) 
 Cyclosomus inustus Andrewes, 1924 
 Cyclosomus madecassus Fairmaire, 1898  
 Cyclosomus philippinus Heller, 1923 
 Cyclosomus rousseaui Dupuis, 1912 
 Cyclosomus rugifrons Jeannel, 1949 
 Cyclosomus somalicus Alluaud, 1935 
 Cyclosomus sumatrensis Bouchard, 1903 
 Cyclosomus suturalis (Wiedemann, 1819)

References

Lebiinae